Marianne is a 1929 American silent romantic-drama film about a French farm girl who, despite already having a French fiancé, falls in love with an American soldier during World War I. It was made first as a silent film, then as a musical with a different cast, but Marion Davies starred in both versions.

Plot summary

Cast
 Marion Davies as Marianne
 Oscar Shaw as Stagg
 Fred Solm as André (as Robert Castle)
 Robert Ames as Soapy
 Scott Kolk as Lieutenant Frane
 Émile Chautard as Père Joseph
 Mack Swain as General
 Oscar Apfel as Major

Production
In her 30th and final silent film, Marion Davies starred for director Robert Z. Leonard in this World War I story about a French girl who falls for an American soldier (Oscar Shaw). Davies was rushed into this project after production of the ill-fated The Five O'Clock Girl shuttered. The film was remade as a sound film. This silent version survives but was long thought lost. When Fred Lawrence Guiles wrote his biography of Davies in 1972, he stated the silent version was lost. The film offered Davies another chance to masquerade, this time as the aged army officer with a big mustache. By the time the decision was made to re-shoot the entire film as a soud film, Oscar Shaw was out and Lawrence Gray was signed as Davies' leading man.

References

External links
 
 
 
 

1929 films
American romantic drama films
American black-and-white films
Films directed by Robert Z. Leonard
American silent feature films
Metro-Goldwyn-Mayer films
American World War I films
1929 romantic drama films
1920s American films
Silent romantic drama films
Silent American drama films